Jeremy Andrew Bulloch (16 February 1945 – 17 December 2020) was an English actor. In a career that spanned six decades, he gained recognition for originating the physical portrayal of Boba Fett in the Star Wars franchise, appearing as the character in the films The Empire Strikes Back (1980) and Return of the Jedi (1983). Bulloch returned to the franchise for a cameo as Captain Colton in 2005's Revenge of the Sith.

Early life
Bulloch was born in Market Harborough, Leicestershire, to Aziz "Diana" (née Meade) and McGregor Bulloch, an aeronautical engineer. He was the middle of three siblings, with three older half-brothers from his mother's earlier marriage. He attended St Leonard's School, Blandford Forum, Dorset, and Dorset House, Littlehampton, West Sussex, before training at the Corona Academy theatre school, London. From the age of five, he enjoyed acting and singing after a school show. He began acting at the age of ten and "appeared in [several] Disney films, British sitcoms and plays".

Career

Early work
At the age of twelve, Bulloch's first professional appearance was in a breakfast cereal commercial. After several uncredited screen appearances, Bulloch's first regular role was in the 1960 TV series Counter-Attack! and (the same year) The Chequered Flag. He went on to have a recurring role in Billy Bunter of Greyfriars School (1961) and a regular role in The Newcomers (1965–1967). At the age of seventeen, he portrayed Hamlet on stage.

In 1962, he appeared with Cliff Richard in the musical film Summer Holiday. He had a part in The Devil's Agent, which also starred Christopher Lee who later portrayed Count Dooku in the Star Wars Prequel Trilogy. He also appeared in two Doctor Who stories, The Space Museum (1965) and The Time Warrior (1973). Coincidentally, David Prowse and John Hollis, who both would later appear alongside Bulloch in The Empire Strikes Back, also appeared in a Jon Pertwee-era Doctor Who serial. In 1973, he appeared in the Malcolm McDowell comedy/musical O Lucky Man!. From 1979 to 1981, he was a regular in the ITV sitcom Agony, in which he played Rob Illingworth, one half of a gay couple. His later television roles included a recurring role as Edward of Wickham in Robin of Sherwood (1984–86). He also had minor roles in three James Bond films, twice playing Smithers, an assistant to Q.

Star Wars
In a career spanning over half a century, Bulloch is best known for his role in Boba Fett's costume in the Star Wars films The Empire Strikes Back and Return of the Jedi, despite the character's "minimal screen time." Toby Hadoke writes that "his precise body language and smouldering presence were ... integral to the character's appeal." The voice was provided by Jason Wingreen originally and in the updated versions by Temuera Morrison, to strengthen the connection with the Prequel Trilogy. Bulloch's half-brother, Robert Watts, who was working as an associate producer for Empire, was tasked with finding someone who "would fit in the costume of Boba Fett." So Watts called Bulloch (who at the time was working on Agony) and encouraged him to see Tiny Nicholls, the wardrobe supervisor and Bulloch had a costume fitting as Boba Fett, which "took 20 minutes to put on."

Additionally, he played a minor role as an Imperial officer (later identified as Lieutenant Sheckil), who grabs Leia when she warns Luke Skywalker of Vader's trap in The Empire Strikes Back. Bulloch was initially to do the scene as Fett when he fires at Skywalker on Cloud City, but with no one available to play the part, Bulloch went to the wardrobe and got changed into the "Imperial Officer's outfit". This was his only non-masked appearance in the original Star Wars films. John Morton, who portrayed the rebel pilot Dak Ralter (during the Battle of Hoth), covered Bulloch as a body double for Fett when the character confronts Vader in the Bespin hallway during Han Solo's torture.

Bulloch returned as Boba Fett for the fan film mockumentary: Return of the Ewok chasing Wicket on the Death Star. He filmed his scenes for Jedi for four weeks. Bulloch was unaware of Fett's apparent demise prior to filming and was disappointed, since he would have liked to do more with his character. Bulloch said that portraying Fett was the most uncomfortable role he played and that putting on the jetpack "was very heavy." Fett's death in Return of the Jedi would later be retconned in the Disney+ series The Mandalorian, in which Bulloch had no involvement.

While portraying Fett, Bulloch drew some inspiration from Clint Eastwood's the Man with No Name. Both Fett and Eastwood's character in A Fistful of Dollars wear similar capes, cradle their gun, ready to shoot and move in slow motion.

In 2004, Bulloch published a limited edition memoir, Flying Solo, which is a humorous account of his personal and professional life, interspersed with tales from the convention circuit. In 2005, for the first time in 22 years, he once again made an appearance in a Star Wars film, Revenge of the Sith. This time he portrayed Captain Jeremoch (a portmanteau of Bulloch's name) Colton piloting Kenobi, Bail Organa and Yoda to Coruscant in an Alderaan Cruiser (later identified as the Sundered Heart and similar to the first vessel to appear in Star Wars). Afterwards, Bulloch played a small cameo role in Star Wars fan films Order of the Sith: Vengeance and its sequel Downfall – Order of the Sith, alongside David Prowse and Michael Sheard. These fan films were made in England in support of Save the Children.

In an interview in 2013, he expressed an interest in being involved in a future Star Wars film in some way, saying, "The lovely thing is ... if I'm wearing a helmet, no one knows how old I am." He subsequently denied involvement in future projects. Although Boba Fett did not appear in Star Wars: The Force Awakens, Bulloch hinted that a film focusing on the origins of Boba Fett would be made. The Book of Boba Fett, a Disney+ television series taking place after the events of Return of the Jedi, premiered in 2021.

He was featured in the 2015 documentary Elstree 1976; a behind-the-scenes film, which focuses on the lives of some actors and extras who appeared in the Star Wars original trilogy. The documentary had a premiere at the BFI London Film Festival.

He was also featured in the 2021 Disney+ documentary special, Under The Helmet: The Legacy of Boba Fett which celebrates the origins and legacy of the character.

Other work
In 2004, Bulloch had a cameo in Mark Hamill's Comic Book: The Movie which also featured some Star Wars alumni such as David Prowse and Peter Mayhew. In 2005, he played the role of "Chairman Skellon" in a stage production of The Trial of Davros. In 2006, Bulloch provided the voice of Sir Logan the Prowler in the Night Traveler multimedia adventure series produced by Lunar Moth Entertainment.

In 2008, Richard LeParmentier, known for his portrayal of Admiral Motti in Star Wars, worked on Motti Now, a spoof of Apocalypse Now, featuring Bulloch and other Star Wars actors, including Kenneth Colley, Garrick Hagon and Jerome Blake.

Personal life and death
Bulloch was married to Maureen Walker; the couple had two sons and lived in London. He had another son from a previous marriage. His half-brother was Robert Watts, who was a producer on The Empire Strikes Back, Return of the Jedi and the Indiana Jones films. Watts also had a cameo as Lieutenant Watts in Return of the Jedi. His son Robbie portrayed Matthew of Wickham in four episodes of Robin of Sherwood. The character is the son of Edward of Wickham portrayed by Bulloch. Another son is the translator Jamie Bulloch. His sister Sally Bulloch was a child actress before becoming an executive manager of the Athenaeum Hotel.

He once considered being a sportsman but ultimately chose to go into acting. Long before portraying Fett, Bulloch trained with David Prowse at his gym in South London. In his spare time, he enjoyed playing cricket and travelling. Bulloch said that he had been a fan of Star Trek ever since the original series.

Following the release of the Star Wars Special Edition trilogy, prequel trilogy and new films, he was frequently invited to science fiction conventions throughout the world, and was inducted as an honorary member of the 501st Legion costuming organisation in May 2002. Later, in November 2009, he actually joined the 501st as a costume-wearing member making appearances with the group as Boba Fett. Beginning in 2000, he was a frequent guest at the Star Wars Weekends (held annually at Disney's Hollywood Studios). In August 2018, Bulloch announced his retirement from attending conventions.

Bulloch died of complications from Parkinson's disease (which he had lived with for many years) at St. George's Hospital in Tooting, London, on 17 December 2020, at the age of 75.

Filmography

Film

Television

References
Footnotes

Citations

Bibliography
 McFarlane, Brian. (2005). The Encyclopaedia of British Film. Methuen. 2nd edition
 Rinser, J. W. (2010). The Making of Star Wars: The Empire Strikes Back.
 Windham, Ryder and Wallace, Daniel. (2011). Star Wars Year by Year Chronicle. Darling Kindersley

External links

 
 
 
 Jeremy Bulloch BFI

1945 births
2020 deaths
20th-century English male actors
21st-century English male actors
Deaths from Parkinson's disease
Neurological disease deaths in England
English male film actors
English male television actors
English male voice actors
Male actors from Leicestershire
People from Market Harborough